Rangeeli Mahal, founded in 1996, is one of the main centers of Jagadguru Kripalu Parishat, is located at Shri Radharani's eternal abode, Barsana. In describing the glory of Barsana dham, Jagadguru Shri Kripalu Ji Maharaj had said that within this Barsana dham resides the divine Barsana dham. In Rangeeli Mahal, there is a large satsang hall with depictions of Shri Radha Krishna's pastimes all around the hall. There are also beautifully landscaped gardens, waterfalls and other attractions.

A temple named Kirti Mandir has been established by Jagadguru Shri Kripalu Ji Maharaj on a 12,000 square feet area in Barsana. This temple has been named after Shri Radharani's mother, Kirti Maiya. Visitors will have the unique darshan of baby Radha sitting in her mother's lap which will be the only kind found in this world.

A free charitable hospital has also been run in Barsana since 14 January 2007 serving patients from neighbouring villages as well as from far away places in Braj.

Events

Janmashtami
Radhastami

Kirti Mandir
Kitri Mandir is a temple in Barsana. This temple is the only one of its kind in the whole world as it is a temple of the Hindu deity Kirti who was the mother of Shri Radha. This temple was inaugurated on 10 February 2019 on the auspicious occasion of Vasant Panchmi. This temple is having a deity of baby Radha in mother Kirti's lap. This temple was envisioned by Jagadguru Shri Kripalu Ji Maharaj.

References

Hindu temples in Mathura district
Radha Krishna temples